Dušan Lagator  (born 29 March 1994) is a Montenegrin footballer who plays as a defensive midfielder for Hungarian Nemzeti Bajnokság I club Debrecen.

Club career
Lagator was born in Cetinje and began his career in Mogren. After 46 games and 3 years in Mogren he moved to Mladost Podgorica. With Mladost he won the Cup in the 2014–15 season. In the winter transfer period 2015–16 was moved to Čukarički.
For Čukarički Lagator he made his debut in the Serbian SuperLiga in the match against Metalac, on February 19, 2016.

On 11 August 2020, he signed with Polish club Wisła Płock.

In July 2022, he signed for Hungarian club Debreceni VSC.

International career
Lagator was part of Montenegrin U-19 team in 2012.

In May 2016 he was part of Montenegro "B" team.

He made his senior debut for Montenegro national football team on 5 September 2019 in a friendly against Hungary, as a 66th-minute substitute for Marko Simić.

Career statistics

Honours
Mladost Podgorica
Montenegro Cup: 2014–15

References

External links

 FSCG profile
 FK Mladost Podgorica profile
 

1994 births
Sportspeople from Cetinje
Living people
Association football midfielders
Montenegrin footballers
Montenegro youth international footballers
Montenegro under-21 international footballers
Montenegro international footballers
FK Mogren players
OFK Titograd players
FK Čukarički players
FC Dynamo Saint Petersburg players
PFC Sochi players
Wisła Płock players
Debreceni VSC players
Montenegrin First League players
Serbian SuperLiga players
Russian First League players
Russian Premier League players
Ekstraklasa players
Nemzeti Bajnokság I players
Montenegrin expatriate footballers
Expatriate footballers in Serbia
Montenegrin expatriate sportspeople in Serbia
Expatriate footballers in Russia
Montenegrin expatriate sportspeople in Russia
Expatriate footballers in Poland
Montenegrin expatriate sportspeople in Poland
Expatriate footballers in Hungary
Montenegrin expatriate sportspeople in Hungary